Hong Kong Junior Open squash championship is considered one of the most prestigious junior open squash championships in Asia and in the world. It is one of just four Tier 2 events used in the world junior rankings, which are surpassed in difficulty only by the World Junior Squash Championships.  The tournament hosts nearly 500 players every year and is organized by the Asian Squash Federation and Hong Kong Squash.

Hong Kong Junior Open is divided into ten categories — Boys Under-19, Boys Under-17, Boys Under-15, Boys Under-13, Boys Under-11, Girls Under-19, Girls Under-17, Girls Under-15, Girls Under-13 and Girls Under-11.

List of winners by category (Boys)

Prior to 1999

After 1999

Boys' champions by country since 1999

List of winners by category (Girls)

Prior to 1999

After 1999

Girls' champions by country since 1999

See also
 Hong Kong Open
 World Junior Squash Circuit
 World Junior Squash Championships
 British Junior Open Squash
 Asian Squash Federation
 Hong Kong Squash

References

External links
Hong Kong Junior Open history
Hong Kong Junior Open website

Squash tournaments in Hong Kong
Squash in Hong Kong
Squash records and statistics
Youth sport in Hong Kong